Piletocera cyclospila is a moth in the family Crambidae. It was described by Edward Meyrick in 1886. It is found on Samoa and Fiji.

References

cyclospila
Moths described in 1886
Moths of Oceania